The mixed team ski jumping event at the 2020 Winter Youth  Olympics was held on 20 January at the Les Tuffes Nordic Centre.

Results
The first round was started at 10:30 and the final round at 11:50.

References

 

Mixed team